The Romanian women's national ice hockey team represents Romania at the International Ice Hockey Federation's IIHF World Women's Championships. The women's national team is controlled by Romanian Ice Hockey Federation. As of 2015, Romania has 53 female players. The Romanian women's national team is no longer ranked in the IIHF since they have not participated since 2011.

History
The Romanian women's national team made their debut at the 2001 Women's World Ice Hockey Championships. They finished 9th out of ten in the qualification event for Division II and thus entered the newly founded Division III in the following year. At the 2004 Women's World Championship, they were relegated to Division IV, which is where they have been competing since then. As the lower divisions saw no match play in 2009, and there was no IIHF World Women's Championship in the Olympic year 2010, the Romanian team will play their first World Championship match in three years at the 2011 IIHF Women's World Championship.

Olympic record
The Romanian women's hockey team has never qualified for an Olympic tournament.

World Championship record

2001 – Finished in 25th place (9th in Division I qualification)
2003 – Finished in 26th place (6th in Division III)
2004 – Finished in 26th place (5th in Division III)
2005 – Finished in 29th place (3rd in Division IV)
2007 – Finished in 29th place (2nd in Division IV)
2008 – Finished in 30th place (3rd in Division IV)
2009 – Division IV cancelled
2011 – Finished in 30th place (4th in Division IV)
2016 – Finished in 33rd place (1st in Division IIB qualification, promoted to Division IIB)
2017 – Finished in 32nd place (6th in Division IIB)
2018 – Finished in 33rd place (6th in Division IIB)
2019 – Finished in 34th place (6th in Division IIB, relegated to Division IIBQ)
2020 – Finished in 37th place (3rd in Division III)
2021 – Cancelled due to the COVID-19 pandemic

All-time record against other nations
As of 14 September 2011

References

External links

IIHF profile
National Teams of Ice hockey Romania

 
 
2001 establishments in Romania